On August 25, 2011 Gilberto Martinez Vera and Maria de Jesus Bravo Pagola made a series of fraudulent Twitter tweets alleging that an attack by drug gangs was in progress at an elementary school in Veracruz Mexico. The tweets caused mass panic that was compared to the War of The World panic. The two were charged with terrorism and faced more than 30 years in jail. The charges were later dropped.

There were 26 car accidents as people left their cars in the middle of the streets, as they ran to pick up their children.

References 

2011 hoaxes
2011 in Mexico
2011 crimes in Mexico
Terrorist incidents in North America in 2011
Terrorist incidents in Mexico in the 2010s
August 2011 crimes
August 2011 events in Mexico